NoteCards was a hypertext-based personal knowledge base system developed at Xerox PARC by Randall Trigg, Frank Halasz and Thomas Moran in 1984. NoteCards was developed after Trigg's pioneering 1983 Ph.D. thesis on hypertext while at the University of Maryland College Park.

NoteCards was built on the model  four basic kinds of objects: notecards, links, browser card, and a filebox. Each window is an analog of a cue card; window sizes may vary, but contents cannot scroll. Local and global maps are available through browsers. There are over 40 different nodes which support various media.

NoteCards was implemented in LISP on D-machine workstations from Xerox which used large, high-resolution displays. The NoteCards interface is event-driven. One interesting feature of NoteCards is that authors may use LISP commands to customize or create entirely new node types. The powerful programming language allows almost complete customization of the entire NoteCards work environment.

Availability
NoteCards was available commercially from the Common Lisp software vendor Venue, compiled for Solaris 2.5 and 7 (untested on later versions) and Linux x86 with the X Window System.

References

Hypertext
HyperCard products